John de Bradleigh was the Archdeacon of Barnstaple until 1267.

References

Archdeacons of Barnstaple